Tongyeong is a coastal city in South Gyeongsang Province, South Korea. It is divided into 1 eup (town), 6 myeon (township) and 11 dong (neighborhood). Chungmu city and Tongyeong county were reunited in 1995, creating Tongyeong City as it is known today. It consists of Goseong Peninsula, Hansan Island,  and other islets. It was formerly known as Chungmu, after the posthumous name of Admiral Yi Sun-sin. The name Tongyeong means "command post" and is itself associated with Admiral Yi, as it refers to his principal base that was located on nearby Hansan Island.

Famous people
Famous people associated with the city include Yi Sun-sin, whose headquarters were located there, and Yun Isang, a noted 20th-century composer.

Chungmu Halmae, or "Chungmu Grandmother", is a mythical old woman from Chungmu who gave her name to Chungmu Halmae Kimbap, a common Korean snack food. Chungmu Halmae, though mythical, is one of the most recognized personages from the area. The decision to group together a number of entities and incorporate them into the city of “Tongyong” erased the name Chungmu from the map of Korea and removed the home of the mythical grandmother from the peninsula.

Park Kyung-ni was a famous novelist, who wrote the well-known novel, Toji (토지, The Land) consisting of 16-volume story, in Korea.

Shin Suk-ja is a political prisoner held in Yodok political prison camp  in North Korea. In August 2011 human rights activists from her hometown started the “Daughter of Tongyeong Rescue Campaign” to rescue her and her children.

Song Hyeong-jun is a member of South Korean boyband Cravity. He was also a former member of South Korean boyband X1 (band). He is best known for competing in survival show Produce X 101 and ranking 4th in the finale.

The football player Kim Min-jae was born in Tongyeong and played football for Tongyeong Elementary School football club. He plays as a centre-back for S.S.C. Napoli and the South Korea national football team.

Sports
Tongyeong was the site of the first race of 2009 in the International Triathlon Union-sponsored ITU World Championship Series, which encompasses "international-distance" triathlon events in cities around the world. On May 3, 2009, Bevan Docherty of New Zealand won the men's race in a thrilling photo finish as he crossed the line almost simultaneously with Brad Kahlefeldt of Australia.

Healthcare
In 2007, the total number of medical institutions was 106, including 4 hospitals, 63 clinics, one long-term care hospital, 22 dental hospitals, 16 Korean traditional medicine clinics. There are also 23 medical institutions related to Tongyeong Health Center affiliated to the Tongyeong City government.

Food

There are several famous food in Tongyeong. Chungmu gimbab :ko:충무김밥 and Ggulbbang :ko:통영꿀빵, a honey bread dessert. Chungmu gimbab is Korean sushi made of seaweed and rice. Also, there is spicy sauce made with baby octopus. Chungmu gimbab is the original(traditional) food in Tongyeong, which used to be called Chungmu.

Ppattegi gruel is a porridge made of dried sweet potatoes. It tastes sweet and full.

Sweet potatoes on Yokji Island in Tongyeong, South Gyeongsang Province, are famous. The sweet potato field here consists of more than 70 percent of the slopes, so it is good to drain water. The amount of sunlight is so abundant that it has an optimal environment for sweet potato cultivation. It is said that the sea raised sweet potatoes, so it is called "Sweet potatoes grown under the sea breeze."

Education

Tongyeong has several representative traditional educational institutions such as Unjudang (운주당), Baegun Seojae (백운서재), Tongyeong Hyanggyo (통영향교). Unjudang established on Hansan Island in 1592, took charge of military education of the Joseon navy. It was later reconstructed with the changed name as "Jeseungdang" (제승당). Baegun Seojae was a seodang, a private village school providing elementary education. Go Si-wan, a Silhak (practical learning) scholar founded it in 1805, the fifth year of King Sunjo's reign. Baegun Seojae is currently situated in the neighborhood of Docheon-dong and designated as the ninth Cultural Material of South Gyeongsang province. Tongyeong Hyanggyo was a state-sponsored provincial school (hyanggyo) and was built in the site of the old Goseong Hyanggyo, which consists of 6 buildings; Daeseongjeon, Dongmu, Seomu, Myeongnyundang, Seojae, and Punghwaru. In the Daeseongjeon shrine, memorial tablets of five prominent scholars and Confucius are instituted.

Modern educational institutions started to be established in the city as Jinnam Commons School, the predecessor of Tongyeong Elementary School was opened in 1908. The educational system of Tongyeong is the same as elsewhere in the country. Schooling begins with preschools, of which there are 34 in the city. This is followed by 6 years in elementary schools, of which Tongyeong has 32 including 14 branch schools. Subsequently, students pass through 3 years of middle school. There are 11 middle schools in Tongyeong. High-school education, which lasts for three years, is not compulsory, but the most students do attend and graduate from high school. Tongyeong is home to 5 high schools. The College of Marine Science at Gyeongsang National University (GNU) is a branch campus in Tongyeong, specializing in marine-related studies. Its predecessor was Tongyeong Marine College, the successor of Gyeongnam Susan Jeonseupso (경남수산전습소) founded in 1917. The college was integrated into Gyeongsang National University in 1994.

Geography

Tongyeong is situated in the southern tip of Goseong peninsula and its three sides are surrounded by the sea. It consists of 41 inhabited and 110 uninhabited islands. Tongyeong Port, the east gate of Hallyeo Marine National Park, is referred to as the most beautiful port in South Korea.

The geography consists of low mountains crossing over the south to the north on the Goseong peninsula. The mountain range stretches out from Byeokbang mountain (650 m) on the boundary of northern Goseong county (Goseong-gun) to the south, encompassing Cheongae mountain (525 m), Baral mountain (261 m), Jeseokbong peak (279 m) and Yongha mountain (461 m) on Mireukdo island.

As Tongyeong is influenced by East Korea Warm Current, it has a mild oceanic climate during the whole year. The coldest month is January, with an average temperature of 2.5 °C while the hottest month is August, with the average temperature of 25.7 °C. The average range of temperature is narrow. Plants growing in the city show characters of the warm temperate zone such as Cryptomeria, Chamaecyparis obtusa, Pinus thunbergii, Paulownia coreana, Pitch Pine, bamboo, camellia, and palm trees.

The average annual rainfall is 1,397 millimeters, so Tongyeong is classified as one of places in South Korea that have a lot of rain.

Climate
Tongyeong has a humid subtropical climate (Köppen: Cfa/Cwa).

Gallery

Twin towns – sister cities

Tongyeong is twinned with:

 Reedley, United States
 Rongcheng, China
 Samara, Russia
 Sayama, Japan
 Tamano, Japan
 Yunfu, China
 Yeosu, South Korea

See also
 List of cities in South Korea
 Tongyeong International Music Festival

References

External links

 City government website

 
Cities in South Gyeongsang Province
Port cities and towns in South Korea